Syana Assembly constituency is one of the 403 constituencies of the Uttar Pradesh Legislative Assembly, India. It is a part of the Bulandshahar district and one of the five assembly constituencies in the Bulandshahr Lok Sabha constituency. First election in this assembly constituency was held in 1957 after the "DPACO (1956)" (delimitation order) was passed in 1956. After the "Delimitation of Parliamentary and Assembly Constituencies Order" was passed in 2008, the constituency was assigned identification number 66.

Wards / Areas
Extent of Syana Assembly constituency is Syana Tehsil.

Members of the Legislative Assembly

Election results

2022

2012

See also
Bulandshahr Lok Sabha constituency
Bulandshahar district
Sixteenth Legislative Assembly of Uttar Pradesh
Uttar Pradesh Legislative Assembly

References

External links
 

Assembly constituencies of Uttar Pradesh
Politics of Bulandshahr district
Constituencies established in 1956
1956 establishments in Uttar Pradesh